is a 2009 Japanese film directed by Keralino Sandorovich.

Awards
31st Yokohama Film Festival
Won: Best Supporting Actress - Sakura Ando

References

2009 films
Films directed by Keralino Sandorovich
2000s Japanese films